Zanthoxylum nitidum, commonly known as shiny-leaf prickly-ash, tez-mui (in Assamese) or liang mian zhen (in China), is a species of flowering plant in the family Rutaceae. It is a woody climber with prickles on the branchlets, thick, cone-shaped spines on the trunk and older branches, pinnate leaves with five to nine leaflets, and panicles or racemes of white to pale yellow, male or female flowers in leaf axils and on the ends of branchlets.

Description
Zanthoxylum nitidum is a woody climber with curved prickles on the branchlets and thick, cone-shaped spines on the trunk and older branches.

Taxonomy
Shiny-leaf prickly-ash was first formally described in 1824 by William Roxburgh who gave it the name Fagara nitida and published the description in Flora Indica, or, descriptions of Indian plants. In 1824, de Candolle changed the name to Zanthoxylum nitidum in his book, Prodromus Systematis Naturalis Regni Vegetabilis.

Distribution
Zanthoxylum nitidum is found in India, South China, southeast Asia, and northern Australia.

Uses
Zanxthoxylum nitidum is used as an insecticide and a piscicide.

In India and Nepal, the fruits are used as a condiment. However, the roots, leaves and fruit are poisonous, with as little as 40g of leaves considered to be a lethal dose.

Zanthoxylum nitidum is one several species of Zanthoxylum that are used in traditional medicine in various parts of the world.

Chemical constituents
The plant contains the chemical compounds nitidine, toddalolactone, and chelerythrine.

The essential oil, at least from some varieties, contains limonene and geraniol.

References

nitidum
Plants described in 1824
Taxa named by William Roxburgh
Flora of Queensland
Flora of China
Flora of tropical Asia